Udakishunganj is one of the administrative divisions of Madhepura district in the Indian state of Bihar. The block headquarters are located at a distance of 35 km from the district headquarters, namely, Madhepura.

Geography

Panchayats
Panchayats in Udakishunganj community development block are: Madhuban, Rampur khora, Kishunganj, Lashkari, Lakshmipur, Biriranpal, Rahta Panhan, Manjaura, Jotaili, Barahi Anadpura, Pipra Karoti, Nayanagar, Khara, Budhma, Sahjadpur and Gopalpur.

Nayanagar is one of the important panchayats because Nayanagar Durga Sthan is situated at a distance of 11 km from Gwalpara Block HQ as well the same distance from Udakishunganj in the west and at the distance of 35 km from Madhepura Distt. HQ is not only famous for Manokamna Siddhi in Mahdepura but also in its adjacent areas. The devotees pay their floral and Bipatra offering to Goddess Durga for the fulfillment of their Manokamna. It is usually said that whose offering is accepted by Goddess his manokamna is fulfilled. The so-called Bairagana Mela is held on every Monday, Wednesday & Friday and the devotees come to worship and pay their offering to Goddess from distant places. Goddess Durga is sitting on flower ‘Lotus’ in peaceful gesture. Animal sacrifice is being offered to the Goddess Durga on the above said days. It would be seen form religious point of view that the status of Lord Chowmukh Mahadeo. Eleven Ubhay lingas and Sun God are also available in this pious place. Where as from archaeological point of view there are only some damaged idol and stone plates. It is said that during excavations a big stone platen was found. Though there is a legend of 100 years worship and foundation of this religious place. It is also said that Raja Radeo Singh was also a devotee of this place. This pious place is spread over the area of 22 acres of land and a big pond is existing before the main Temple in which the sacrificial animals are being bathed. It is also said that the people whose manokamna is fulfilled by the grace of Goddess they sacrificed the animals before the deity for her pleasure. Some sandal trees are also available there. It is said that such type of sandalwoods is found only in that holy place and that sandal is consumed in the worship of Goddess Durga. Sandalwood is not sold here for commercial purposes. The main Temple has been constructed with contribution cooperation of the common people and a committee has been formed to look after the management of the Temple. But the communication system especially relating to roads is very poor and hazardous for the devotees. Tourism Deptt. Of Govt. is not taking interest in the upliftment of this Temple. Perhaps in has not been taken over by the Govt. as yet. The people are willing the Govt. interest for this place so that it may get proper importance from religious and archeological point of view.

Demographics
In the 2001 census Udakishunganj Block had a population of 136,937.

See also
 बिहारीगंज, Madhepura (Vidhan Sabha constituency)

References

Community development blocks in Madhepura district।